Los Traidores (The Traitors) may refer to:

 Los Traidores (band), a Uruguayan rock band
 Los traidores de San Ángel, 1967 action film directed by Leopoldo Torre Nilsson